Robert E. Jarvis (15 November 1935 – 14 December 2017) was a Canadian Progressive Conservative member of the House of Commons of Canada. He was a lawyer by career.

He represented Ontario's Willowdale electoral district which he won in the 1979 federal election. He sat in the 31st Canadian Parliament, during which he was not appointed to Prime Minister Joe Clark's cabinet. He lost his seat in the 1980 federal election to Liberal challenger Jim Peterson.

After his political career, he became chairman of the Canada Mortgage and Housing Corporation (CMHC) in May 1985. In the late 1980s, he also served as a lawyer for Korgold Development, which sought to build apartment units in Mississauga, Ontario which were eligible for CMHC funding.

He died on 14 December 2017.

References

External links
 
 

1935 births
2017 deaths
Members of the House of Commons of Canada from Ontario
Progressive Conservative Party of Canada MPs
Lawyers in Ontario
Burials at York Cemetery, Toronto